Edmund Stafford (1344 – 3 September 1419) was Bishop of Exeter from 1395 to his death in 1419.

Origins

He was the second son of Sir Richard Stafford (born post 1301-d.1381) "of Clifton Campville" in Staffordshire (the second son of Edmund Stafford, 1st Baron Stafford (1272/3-1308) of Stafford Castle in Staffordshire and the younger brother of Ralph Stafford, 1st Earl of Stafford, 2nd Baron Stafford (1301-1372) of Stafford Castle). His father is stated in some sources to have been "Baron Stafford of Clifton", but no such title is listed in the authoritative The Complete Peerage. His mother was Isabel de Vernon (d.1356), a daughter of Richard de Vernon (d.1323) (son and heir apparent of Richard de Vernon of Haddon Hall in Derbyshire, whom he predeceased) by his wife Maud de Camville, a daughter and co-heiress of William de Camville, 2nd Baron Camville (1268-1338), of Clifton Campville.

Career
Stafford attended Oxford University, graduating BA in 1363; in the same year he was appointed a canon of Lichfield. He obtained a BCL in 1369 and a DL in 1385, the same year he became dean of York. He also held the Rectorship of Clifton Campville, his family lands. Whilst dean of York, he was named keeper of the Privy Seal on 4 May 1389, keeping that role until February 1396. Later that year, he was appointed Lord Chancellor of England, holding it until 1399 when, on the accession of Henry IV, he was replaced. Two years later he again took up the role, appointed as part of a reaction against Henry's dependence on Lancastrians. He was replaced by Henry Beaufort in February 1403. Edmund continued to serve the King, trying petitions in Parliaments in 1404 and 1406 and being appointed one of the King's councillors in the parliament of 1406.

Stafford was nominated to the see of Exeter on 15 January 1395 and consecrated on 20 June 1395. Visits to his diocese were few when he was in government office; he did visit extensively in the time between appointments as Chancellor and after 1403 he became more involved, with extensive vistas in 1404, 1411 and 1414.

Death and burial
Stafford died on 3 September 1419 and was buried in the Lady Chapel of Exeter Cathedral, where survives his elaborate monument with recumbent alabaster effigy. His family lands and the barony passed to Thomas Stafford. His executors are named in 1421.

Citations

References
 

Bishops of Exeter
Lords Privy Seal
1344 births
1419 deaths

Barons Stafford (1371 creation)
Lord chancellors of England
Deans of York
14th-century English Roman Catholic bishops
15th-century English Roman Catholic bishops
Burials at Exeter Cathedral
Edmund